The Takemoto-za (竹本座) was a bunraku theatre in Osaka, founded in 1684 by Takemoto Gidayū. Plays by many famous playwrights were performed there, including works by Chikamatsu Monzaemon, Namiki Sōsuke, and Takeda Izumo I. Many of the playwrights working at the Takemoto-za worked together, as a committee, as was the custom at the time.

The Takemoto-za had a fierce rival in the Toyotake-za, built by one of Takemoto Gidayū's former disciples.

Though bunraku remained exceptionally popular through 1764, at that time it began to be eclipsed by kabuki and to fall into decline. The Takemoto-za was forced to close in 1767, and though it opened once more after that, it soon afterwards closed again.

References
Frederic, Louis (2002). "Japan Encyclopedia." Cambridge, Massachusetts: Harvard University Press.
Kabuki Glossary at Kabuki21.com. Accessed 14 September 2006.

Buildings and structures completed in 1684
1767 disestablishments
Bunraku
Culture in Osaka
Former theatres in Japan
1684 establishments in Japan